The media phone represents a new category of broadband multimedia devices that has the potential to become the 4th screen in the home, complementing the PC, TV, and mobile phone handset.

Features 

The original "Media Phone" and many of its features were invented and conceptualised in 2008 by Roy A. Tindle of Elkhart, IN, and was introduced to potential investors, engineers and other interested parties under non-disclosure at that time.  Original documentation, drawings, schematics, and prototypes have been publicly recorded for authentication of origination. Roy A. Tindle is also the creator and designer of various wire harnesses, tools, and other consumer-based products.

Media phone combines the functionality of a VoIP phone and home networking controller with an expansive touch screen for web browsing, photo viewing, and interacting with connected widgets.

Typically available features:

 Internet phone (IP-based voice and video calls)
 Web browser
 Digital photo frame
 Organizer
 Mp3 and WMV player
 FM and internet radio
 SMS/MMS device
 Built-in camera
 Widgets
 Additional advanced features such as the unique "In-Home Billboard" and "Remote Viewing" features are also available which may be appealing to consumers and businesses alike.  These features create a new advertising platform for businesses and a revolutionary new home security format which provides Media Phone users the ability to monitor their home or business remotely from any computer or smartphone.  This same remote viewing feature also allows 911 dispatchers to identify potential threats such as intruders, fire or EMS needs before dispatching emergency responders.
The device can be controlled through the touchscreen with a finger or accompanying stylus and can have an SD card slot, USB and flash memory. It comes with a wireless handset for phone calls.

What is inside 

 Application processor (Intel Atom, ARM, etc.)
 High-level operating system (HLOS), widget-based
 VoIP software for IP calls

Examples 

The media phone can be used by wireline telecom operators for value-added IP service delivery. Several major carriers have introduced media phones, for example, iriver Wave Home by Korea Telecom, Home Manager, by AT&T and Verizon Hub. 
Bittel Hotel integration solution by Bittel Electronics] 
Others are expected to follow the trend.

Video 

A media phone is basically a replacement for a traditional home cordless telephone. All calls (voice only by Verizon Hub, AT&T Home Manager, and voice & video by Korea Telecom Wave Home) are IP based. The call functionality is provided by embedded software – by a voice engine for voice-only calls and by a voice & video engine for video calls. The voice & video engine is required to compensate for the commonly known IP-related issues (delays, packet loss, jitter, congestion, etc.), and to make IP calls as reliable and convenient as conventional PSTN calls.

References

See also 

 Cordless phone
 Digital Enhanced Cordless Telecommunications
 IP Phone
 Minitel
 List of video telecommunication services and product brands
 SPIRIT DSP
 Voice over Internet Protocol

New media
Voice over IP
Telephony equipment
Teleconferencing